Mattampally is a village in the Suryapet district, Telangana, India. It is located 13 km from the banks of the Krishna River, in Mattampally mandal of Kodad revenue division..It is located about 69km from the district headquarters Suryapet.

References

Villages in Suryapet district
Mandal headquarters in Suryapet district